QSI International School of Tbilisi  (QSIT) is a nonprofit English-language International school in Tbilisi, Georgia. It was established in 1995. Its curriculum is similar to that of U.S. Schools. Students range from Pre-K (age 2) to Grade 12 (age 18). The current enrollment is about 250 students from 35 different countries. QSIT is part of QSI and is accredited by the Middle States Association of Colleges and Schools. The accreditation was renewed in 2015.

Facilities 
In 2007 the school moved to a brand new 5600 square meter facility  and provides an outstanding environment to learn and grow including a full size gymnasium, a cafeteria, soccer and baseball field, fully equipped science labs, two libraries, and a new CrossFit gym.

Curriculum
QSIT has a comprehensive program for university preparation. The curriculum includes English (reading, grammar, composition, and spelling) Mathematics, Cultural Studies, Science, Computer Literacy, Art, Music and Physical Education. Intensive English classes are offered to students who need additional help with English. Additional language acquisition, Language other than English (LOE), is provided in Georgian, Russian, German, French, Spanish, and Mandarin. Students and parents are given full access to the curriculum. Materials and equipments are up-to-date and of high quality. Class sizes are kept small to ensure personal attention for ALL students.

In addition to students earning the Internationally Recognized QSI Diploma, Advanced Placement (AP) courses and examinations are offered. Every year 10-15 different AP courses are offered in QSIT: AP English literature, AP Physics, AP Calculus, AP Biology, AP Government & Politics and AP Economics.
Taking AP courses and exams improves students chances of getting into university and can even help them to minimize their university costs. If a student earns a qualifying score on AP Exam, they can receive credit for the equivalent course at universities across the United States and in 60 other countries around the world. Universities value students who take the most challenging courses available at their school - for QSIT, AP courses are the most advanced courses offered.

Grading System
QSIT adheres to a Mastery Learning approach to education that provides detailed feedback for students as they work toward ownership of the material. Grades reflect the current progress that students have made within a unit of study. When students demonstrate mastery they are rewarded with and 'A' or 'B'. Thus a student never fails in the traditional sense. Instead the student proceeds logically through the curriculum at a pace determined by his or her mastery of the material.

Faculty
QSIT employees Native English-speaking, experienced fully qualified teachers from Western Countries to teach all core curriculum and homeroom classes. Foreign languages as well as special classes are taught by experienced educators from around the world.

See also 

List of international schools

References

External links 
 School Website

Tbilisi
International high schools
International schools in Georgia (country)
American international schools in Asia
Tbilisi
Education in Tbilisi
Educational institutions established in 1995
1995 establishments in Georgia (country)